Lake Whippoorill, also known as Barton Lake, is an oblong freshwater lake in the community of Lake Hart, which is in Orange County, Florida. Some development surrounds this lake and on the west side it is bordered by the Lake Whippoorill Kampground of America. Just to the north and west is the Central Florida Greenway, (Florida State Road 417). A canal, probably not even traversable by even a very small boat, connects Lake Whippoorill to Lake Hart, to the east.

Boating is allowed on this lake, but it has no public boat docks. It also has no public swimming areas.

References

Whippoorill